The 1992 Winter Olympics torch relay took part as part of the build-up to the 1992 Winter Olympics hosted in Albertville, France. Michel Platini and François-Cyrille Grange lit the cauldron at the opening ceremony.

Torch
Designed by French artist, Philippe Starck. The torch resembles a horn of a bull or a flame (if turned upside down).

Route

References

Torch Relay, 1992 Winter Olympics
Olympic torch relays